Terrence Joseph Sejnowski (born 13 August 1947) is the Francis Crick Professor at the Salk Institute for Biological Studies where he directs the Computational Neurobiology Laboratory and is the director of the Crick-Jacobs center for theoretical and computational biology. He has performed pioneering research in neural networks and computational neuroscience.

Sejnowski is also Professor of Biological Sciences and adjunct professor in the departments of neurosciences, psychology, cognitive science, computer science and engineering at the University of California, San Diego, where he is co-director of the Institute for Neural Computation.

With Barbara Oakley, he co-created and taught Learning How To Learn: Powerful mental tools to help you master tough subjects, the world's most popular online course, available on Coursera.

Education and early life 
Born in Cleveland in 1947, Sejnowski received his B.S. in physics in 1968 from the Case Western Reserve University, M.A. in physics from Princeton University with John Archibald Wheeler, and a PhD in physics from Princeton University in 1978 with John Hopfield.

Career and research
From 1978–1979 Sejnowski was a postdoctoral fellow in the Department of Biology at Princeton University with Alan Gelperin and from 1979–1981 he was a postdoctoral fellow in the Department of Neurobiology at Harvard Medical School with Stephen Kuffler. In 1982 he joined the faculty of the Department of Biophysics at the Johns Hopkins University, where he achieved the rank of Professor before moving to San Diego, California in 1988. He was an Investigator at the Howard Hughes Medical Institute from 1991 to 2018.

He has had a long-standing affiliation with the California Institute of Technology, as a Wiersma Visiting Professor of Neurobiology in 1987, as a Sherman Fairchild Distinguished Scholar in 1993 and as a part-time Visiting Professor 1995–1998. In 2004 he was named the Francis Crick Professor at the Salk Institute and the director of the Crick-Jacobs Center for Theoretical and Computational Biology.

Honours and awards
Sejnowski received a Presidential Young Investigator Award in 1984 from the National Science Foundation (NSF).  He received the Wright Prize from the Harvey Mudd College for excellence in interdisciplinary research in 1996 and the Hebb Prize for his contributions to learning algorithms by the International Neural Network Society in 1999.  He became a Fellow of the Institute of Electrical and Electronics Engineers in 2000 and received their Neural Network Pioneer Award in 2002. In 2003 he was elected to the Johns Hopkins Society of Scholars. He is a Senior Fellow of the Design Futures Council. He was elected to the National Academy of Medicine in 2008. In 2010 he was elected a Member of the National Academy of Sciences (NAS), and elected to the National Academy of Engineering in 2011. In 2017 he was elected to the National Academy of Inventors. These achievements place him in a group of only three living people to have been elected to all four of the national academies. In 2013 he was elected to the American Academy of Arts and Sciences and was elected Fellow of the American Physical Society in 2014. He was awarded the 2015 Swartz Prize for Theoretical and Computational Neuroscience from the Society for Neuroscience. He received an Honorary Doctorate from the University of Zurich in 2017. In 2022 he was awarded the Gruber Neuroscience Prize.

Neural networks 
His research in neural networks and computational neuroscience has been pioneering. In the early 1980s, particularly following work by John Hopfield, computer simulations of neural networks became widespread. Early applications, particularly by Sejnowski and Geoffrey Hinton, demonstrated that simple neural networks could be made to learn tasks of at least some sophistication. In 1989, Sejnowski founded Neural Computation, published by the MIT Press, the leading journal in neural networks and computational neuroscience.  He is also the President of the Neural Information Processing Systems Foundation, a non-profit organization that oversees the annual NeurIPS Conference.  This interdisciplinary meeting brings together researchers from many disciplines, including biology, physics, mathematics, and engineering.

He co-invented the Boltzmann machine with Geoffrey Hinton and pioneered the application of learning algorithms to difficult problems in speech (NETtalk) and vision. His postdoc, Tony Bell, developed the infomax algorithm for Independent Component Analysis (ICA) which  has been widely adopted in machine learning, signal processing and data mining.

Research 
The long-range goal of Sejnowski's research is to understand the computational resources of brains and to build linking principles from brain to behavior using computational models.  This goal is being pursued with a combination of theoretical and experimental approaches at several levels of investigation ranging from the biophysical level to the systems level.  Hippocampal and cortical slice preparations are being used to explore the properties of single neurons and synapses, including the precision of spike firing and the influence of neuromodulators. Biophysical models of electrical and chemical signal processing within neurons are used as an adjunct to physiological experiments. New techniques have been developed for modeling cell signaling using Monte Carlo methods (MCell).

The central issues being addressed are how dendrites integrate synaptic signals in neurons, how networks of neurons generate dynamical patterns of activity, how sensory information is represented in the cerebral cortex, how memory representations are formed and consolidated during sleep, and how visuo-motor transformations are adaptively organized. His laboratory has developed new methods for analyzing the sources for electrical and magnetic signals recorded from the scalp and hemodynamic signals from functional neuroimaging by blind separation using ICA. The EEGLAB public software which was as of 2012 the most popular software for processing EEG data was originally developed in his laboratory.

Symposia 
He has participated and spoken at the Beyond Belief symposia in 2006 and 2007. He participated in the conference Waking Up to Sleep at the Salk Institute in February 2007 (online video available).

Membership 
Sejnowski was a member of the Advisory Committee to the Director of the National Institutes of Health for the Brain Research through Application of Innovative Neurotechnologies (BRAIN) Initiative, announced by President Obama on 2 April 2013.  Their BRAIN 2025 report was released by NIH on 5 June 2014 and has been used to prioritize NIH BRAIN Initiative projects.  He was previously part of a team of engineers and neuroscientists who developed the Brain Activity Map Project, which served as the template for the BRAIN Initiative.

Authorship 
In 1992 Sejnowski co-authored The Computational Brain with Patricia Churchland and in 2002 the book Liars, Lovers, and Heroes; What the New Brain Science Reveals About How We Become Who We are with Steven R. Quartz. His most recent book, The Deep Learning Revolution, was published by the MIT Press in June 2018.

He has co-created (with Professor Barbara Oakley) and teaches Learning How to Learn: Powerful mental tools to help you master tough subjects, a massive open online course offered on Coursera. The course had its first three runs in August and October 2014 and January 2015, when it attracted approximately 300,000 students. In 2015, enrollment in the course reached 1 million and a total of about 2 million students as of August 2017 and 3 million students as of 2021.

References 

American neuroscientists
American computer scientists
Case Western Reserve University alumni
Princeton University alumni
Johns Hopkins University faculty
Harvard Medical School people
Howard Hughes Medical Investigators
Living people
Members of the United States National Academy of Sciences
Members of the United States National Academy of Engineering
1947 births
Fellows of the American Academy of Arts and Sciences
Fellows of the Cognitive Science Society
Fellows of the American Physical Society
American people of Polish descent
Salk Institute for Biological Studies people
Members of the National Academy of Medicine